The Lockheed Martin X-56 is an American modular unmanned aerial vehicle that is being designed to explore High-Altitude Long Endurance (HALE) flight technologies for use in future military unmanned reconnaissance aircraft.

Design and development
Designed by Lockheed Martin's Advanced Development Programs, known informally as the Skunk Works, the aircraft was first revealed by Aviation Week, and is intended to research active flutter suppression and gust-load alleviation technologies. The X-56A is based on Lockheed's earlier UAV work, showing influence from the Polecat, Sentinel and DarkStar UAVs. The program calls for the construction of two -long fuselages and a wingspan of 27.5 ft, with four sets of wings being constructed for flight testing.

Operational history
The X-56A first flew on 26 July 2013, flying from Edwards Air Force Base; twenty flights were to be flown on behalf of the Air Force Research Laboratory before the aircraft would be handed over to NASA for further testing.

The first X-56A unmanned aircraft was severely damaged in a crash shortly after takeoff from the dry lakebed at Edwards AFB, California, on 19 November 2015, on its first flexible-wing flight to test active flutter suppression. The aircraft had previously made 16 flights with stiff wings to prove its operating envelope.

The second X-56A unmanned aircraft flew for the first time on 9 April 2015 while under operation by NASA. The aircraft flew eight flights with the stiff wings to clear its operating envelope. The vehicle then completed its first flight with the highly flexible wings on 31 August 2017.

Slender, flexible and lighter low-drag wings would be enabled by flutter suppression.

NASA’s X-56B unmanned air vehicle was destroyed in a crash on 9 July 2021 after suffering an “anomaly in flight”.

Specifications (X-56A)

See also

References

External links

 Lockheed Martin X-56 page 
 Lockheed Martin X-56 (2012): Active Flutter Suppression  Aviation Week I& Space Technology

X-056
2010s United States experimental aircraft
Unmanned aerial vehicles of the United States
Twinjets
Blended wing body
NASA aircraft
Aircraft first flown in 2013